A list of notable groups devoted to promoting astronomy research and education.

Africa
African Astronomical Society

South Africa
Astronomical Society of Southern Africa

Asia

China
Chinese Astronomical Society

India
Akash Mitra Mandal
Astronomical Society of India
Bangalore Astronomical Society (BAS)
Confederation of Indian Amateur Astronomers
IUCAA
Jyotirvidya Parisanstha
Khagol Mandal
Khagol Vishwa

Europe
European Astronomical Society
European Association for Astronomy Education

France
Société astronomique de France
Société Française d'Astronomie et d'Astrophysique (SF2A)

Germany
Astronomische Gesellschaft

Greece 
Hellenic Astronomical Society

Ireland 
Irish Astronomical Society
Irish Federation of Astronomical Societies

Italy
Unione Astrofili Italiani

Norway
Norwegian Astronomical Society

Poland
Polish Astronomical Society

Serbia
Astronomical Society Ruđer Bošković

Turkey
Spaceturk

United Kingdom
Airdrie Astronomical Association
Astronomical Society of Edinburgh
Astronomical Society of Glasgow
Astronomy Centre
British Astronomical Association
Crayford Manor House Astronomical Society
Federation of Astronomical Societies
Kielder Observatory Astronomical Society
Liverpool Astronomical Society
Manchester Astronomical Society
Mexborough & Swinton Astronomical Society
Northumberland Astronomical Society
Nottingham Astronomical Society
Royal Astronomical Society
Society for Popular Astronomy
Society for the History of Astronomy

North America

Canada
Canadian Astronomical Society
Royal Astronomical Society of Canada

Mexico
Nibiru Sociedad Astronomica
Sociedad Astronómica de Xalapa
Sociedad Astronómica de México
Sociedad Astronómica del Estado de Veracruz
Sociedad Astronómica de Minaatitlán
Sociedad Astronómica de Guadalajara
Sociedad Astronómica de Pánuco

United States
Amateur Astronomers Association of Pittsburgh
American Association of Variable Star Observers
American Astronomical Society
American Meteor Society
Association of Lunar and Planetary Observers
Astronomical League
Astronomical Society of the Pacific
Birmingham Astronomical Society
Central Maine Astronomical Society
Escambia Amateur Astronomers Association
Indiana Astronomical Society
Kaua‘i Educational Association for Science and Astronomy
Kopernik Astronomical Society
Louisville Astronomical Society
Milwaukee Astronomical Society
Mohawk Valley Astronomical Society
NASA Night Sky Network 
SETI Institute
Shreveport-Bossier Astronomical Society
Southern Cross Astronomical Society

Oceania

Australia
Astronomical Society of Australia
Astronomical Society of New South Wales
Astronomical Society of South Australia
Astronomical Society of Victoria
Macarthur Astronomical Society
Sutherland Astronomical Society
Astronomical Society of Geelong

New Zealand
Dunedin Astronomical Society
Royal Astronomical Society of New Zealand
Whakatane Astronomical Society

South America

Brazil
Sociedade Astronômica Brasileira

International
International Meteor Organization
Network for Astronomy School Education
The Planetary Society

See also
:Category: Astronomy organizations by name
:Category: Amateur astronomy organizations by name

References

 
Lists of organizations
Societies